As the World Burns is the first studio album by American hip hop group Arsonists. It was released on Matador Records in 1999. It peaked at number 78 on the Billboard Top R&B/Hip-Hop Albums chart.

Critical reception
Jordan N. Mamone of CMJ New Music Report said: "The mood and the beats can get a little outlandish, but generally, the minor-key strings and time-capsule scratches admirably push hip-hop into the future while taking cues from its past."

In 2015, Fact placed it at number 72 on the "100 Best Indie Hip-Hop Records of All Time" list.

Track listing

Charts

References

External links
 

1999 debut albums
Hip hop albums by American artists
Matador Records albums